The 1953 Pennsylvania Railroad train wreck occurred on January 15, 1953, when a passenger and mail train from Boston to Washington DC (the Federal) failed to brake sufficiently on its approach to Union Station, Washington, jumping the platform and plunging through the floor of the concourse. There were no deaths, but 43 people were injured.

The cause of the accident was a design flaw that allowed a brake-valve to close without human intervention.

Description of the accident
The Federal (No. 173), was a southbound, Boston-to-Washington, D.C., overnight train carrying mail and passengers. When the train arrived in New Haven, a New Haven electric locomotive replaced the diesel along with adding several passenger cars from Springfield for the run to New York's Penn Station where PRR GG1 No. 4876, an electric locomotive, was coupled on; the train had 16 coaches and Pullman sleeping cars.

Its brakes were sticking, and a 45-minute inspection occurred. Conductors discovered a closed "angle cock" (an air shutoff valve) at the rear of the third car. The airbrake system aboard the rail cars had angle cocks at each end of each car. Both valves had to be open for the airbraking system to operate properly. The only closed angle cocks should have been on the front of the locomotive and at the rear of the final car. Air brakes on trains are powered by a compressed air reservoir aboard each car. The engine supplies air pressure that is supposed to flow through the airbrake system along the entire length of the train. When this pressure is reduced by the engineer, valves on each car cause air pressure from the car's own reservoir to flow into the car's brake cylinder which applies brake shoes against the wheels and slows down the train. If the cars separate or the air pressure is "dumped" by the engineer in an emergency, the pressure immediately drops to zero and all cars in the train will brake to an emergency stop as a fail safe. Closing an angle cock at any point along the system disables this fail-safe and prevents the reduction in air pressure from being able to apply any brakes behind the closed angle cock.

A routine inspection during the train's stop in New York City, inspectors later said, found the angle cock in the correct, open position. But an after-accident investigation by the ICC revealed that the handle of the angle cock at the rear of the third coach was not in the correct position, as  a design flaw on New Haven coach #8665 allowed the handle of the angle cock valve to come into contact with the  coupler, causing the valve to close. This meant that the engine could only activate the braking power of the first three coaches.

The Federal departed New York City at 4:38 A.M. It made its regularly scheduled stops at Philadelphia; Wilmington, Delaware; and Baltimore. No braking trouble was reported at these stops.  It departed Baltimore at 7:50 A.M.

Baltimore was the train's last stop before arriving at Union Station, its final destination. As the train neared Landover, Maryland, engineer Henry W. Brower tried to slow the train for its approach into the stub-ended tracks of Washington but the train slowed to just . Brower put the engine into reverse, but the electric engine began malfunctioning due to the stress placed on it. Sparks began flying from the wheels of the engine and first three coaches as they alone tried to slow the train.

This caused the train to accelerate. Brower began sounding a distress signal on the engine's air horn.

In the train yard at Union Station, tower operator John Feeney in K Tower set the switches to route the Federal onto Track 16. When the train raced past him at high speed, he telephoned the stationmaster's office. Clerk Ray Klopp picked up the phone. Feeney shouted, "Runaway on Track 16!" Klopp looked up to see the train racing directly toward his office. He shouted, "Run for your lives!" Then he and the other clerks ran out of the office as fast as they could. (They had just 20 seconds to get out of harm's way.) Aboard the train, conductor Thomas J. Murphy ran through the train from end to end, shouting at the passengers to get down as low as they could on the floor or on their seats.

The wreck
Passengers aboard the train knew something was wrong. The train would normally be moving very slowly as it passed beneath Florida Avenue. But this time it rushed past the bridge.

It had slowed to just  when it struck the bumper (the steel barrier at the end of the track). The train crashed through the buffer stop, then through the stationmaster's office, and then demolished a newsstand. The locomotive began skidding to its right. It also destroyed a steel pillar in the concourse, and tore through the concourse's concrete floor (which was  higher than the tracks outside).

The floor, not designed to hold the weight of a train, gave way beneath the  locomotive, and the rear of the engine plunged into the baggage and mail rooms in the basement below.

Two coaches came loose from the engine and the rest of the train. One of them slid onto the concourse to the right of the engine, coming to rest almost abreast of it.  The other nosed downward behind the engine into the gigantic hole in the concourse floor. Six more coach cars jumped the tracks behind the train.

The engine was just inches from smashing into the crowded waiting room beyond the concourse. A Life magazine photo showed the nose of the engine just pushing open the doors to the waiting room.

Amazingly, no one died during the accident.  Only 43 people were injured, six seriously enough to require overnight hospitalization. Most of the workers in the basement had just departed for their coffee break, which spared their lives. Four Union Station workers were briefly trapped in the wreckage, but quickly extricated. The engineer had no injuries, and the fireman received only scratches. Both men climbed out of the engine under their own power.

The stationmaster's clock, which was found in the wreckage, showed the time frozen at 8:38 A.M.

Aftermath
NBC News was able to broadcast live from Union Station just 67 minutes after the wreck occurred. This was, for the time, one of the fastest live nationwide broadcasts ever made.

Despite the extensive damage to Union Station, train service to and from D.C. was delayed but not canceled. The railroad called in a local contractor, Steiner Construction Co. of Baltimore to assess the damage and make temporary repairs. As the incident occurred just five days before the inauguration of Dwight D. Eisenhower as the 34th President of the United States, it was decided to make temporary repairs to accommodate the expected crowds. Working round the clock, the derailed cars were removed, the engine lowered into the basement, and Steiner Construction erected a temporary wooden floor over the hole in the concourse and covered it with quick-drying asphalt in just two days. The workers also built a temporary station master's office and newsstand in time for the crowds coming in to DC. PRR #4876 was later cut up on site, with the pieces hauled up the baggage ramp into gondola cars to be shipped back to the Pennsylvania Railroad's main shop complex in Altoona, Pennsylvania. After new frames were ordered and a replacement superstructure fabricated, any components that were able to be reused went towards what was essentially a new 4876 that remained in service for another 30 years. 
Having been retired in 1983, 4876 is currently in storage at the Baltimore & Ohio Railroad Museum in Baltimore with no current plans for restoration. 

The wreck of the Federal later inspired a similar scene in the 1976 motion picture Silver Streak.

References

Bibliography

 
 
 
 

Railway accidents and incidents in Washington, D.C.
1953 in Washington, D.C.
Railway accidents in 1953
Accidents and incidents involving Pennsylvania Railroad
Runaway train disasters
January 1953 events in the United States